The Basilica of Our Lady of Perpetual Help is a church in Sunset Park, Brooklyn, New York City. It is located on 5th Avenue between 59th and 60th Streets in the Sunset Park neighborhood and occupies half the length of the block between 5th and 6th Avenues, with the rectory and ancillary buildings occupying the remainder of the blocks. The basilica is visible from the Gowanus Expressway two blocks west. It is popularly referred to by its initials, OLPH. The parish celebrated its 125th anniversary in 2017.

History
The parish of Our Lady of Perpetual Help was established by Bishop Charles Edward McDonnell in November 1892 to serve the residents of the Sunset Park area of Brooklyn. It was formed from the parishes of Our Lady of Angels and St. Michael. The Congregation of the Most Holy Redeemer (Redemptorists) purchased land, bordered by 59th and 60th Streets and by Fifth and Sixth Avenues in what was then a relatively rural area. The first Mass was celebrated on Easter Sunday, April 2, 1893, in the Morse family house on 54th Street and 4th Avenue. A wooden frame church on Fifth Avenue between 59th and 60th Streets was dedicated by Bishop Charles Edward McDonnell on January 14, 1894.

The Redemptorists hold a particular regard for Mary, under the title Our Lady of Perpetual Help. On May 6, 1894, they established the devotion in the parish, distributing prayer cards. The following December a copy of the icon of Our Lady of Perpetual Help, brought from Rome, was installed in the new church. The perpetual novena to Mary under the title of Our Lady of Perpetual Help continues.

Construction on the current church began in 1907. The lower level was opened for services two years later, with the upper church completed in 1928. The church was designated a minor basilica on November 1, 1969.

At the time of its completion, the parish was largely Irish in character (as evidenced by the inscriptions on the memorial windows). It was built on what was known as Irish Hill. Some of the family names include Collins, Brennan, Wade, Connors, Burns, McCaffrey, Healy, and Coffey. There is still an Irish presence, but today it is predominantly Hispanic and Chinese. The basilica enjoys large attendance, particularly on holidays such as Ash Wednesday, Palm Sunday and Christmas.

The parish offers immigration services in its Juan Neumann Center, operates a food pantry, hosts a Chinese senior citizen group and leases space to benefit the community to a pre-k program and Lutheran Medical Center.

Description
The basilica, founded and still staffed by the Redemptorists, is a Roman Catholic parish church of the Diocese of Brooklyn. It is dedicated to Our Lady of Perpetual Help, and serves as a pro-cathedral. The architect was Franz Joseph Untersee of Boston. The granite church is Romanesque with a limestone exterior. As a double chapel, the basilica has two floors of worship, like the Basilica of San Francesco d'Assisi. The upstairs church was commonly only used to host weddings and special group services such as confirmation and communion, but has come back into more frequent use. For many years, mass in Spanish was held upstairs because of the large number of parishioners in attendance. Masses are also celebrated in Chinese and Vietnamese. The lower level is for smaller services. The first floor has been renovated many times in recent years.

Because of its size, the basilica hosts major diocesan services (e.g., ordinations) that would otherwise be held at Brooklyn's other, considerably smaller basilica, the Cathedral Basilica of St. James. For the same reason, it also hosts more somber events; it is a venue-of-choice for the larger funerals of those who have fallen in the line of duty while in the service of the New York City Police Department and the New York City Fire Department.

Surroundings

The parish has an elementary school down the block on 6th Avenue and 59th and 60th Street. OLPH elementary school opened September 9, 1903 and was staffed by the Sisters of St. Joseph of Brentwood. The school celebrated its 100th anniversary in 2003. From 1956 until 1999 there was an OLPH Commercial High School for girls. Students at both were taught by the Sisters of St. Joseph, whose convent is on 59th Street and 6th Avenue. A rectory for the Redemptorist priests is on 59th Street between 5th and 6th Avenues.

In 2012, the not-for-profit Regina Opera Company moved to the auditorium of OLPH Catholic Academy.

The basilica is served by the New York City Subway's BMT Fourth Avenue Line at the 59th Street subway station.

Notable people
Chuck Connors, of The Rifleman, grew up in the neighborhood and served as an altar boy at OLPH.

References

External links 
 
 Our Lady Of Perpetual Help Basilica

Our Lady of Perpetual Help in Brooklyn, Basilica of
Our Lady of Perpetual Help in Brooklyn, Basilica of
Redemptorist churches in the United States
Sunset Park, Brooklyn
Double chapels